In Aztec mythology, Malinalxochitl, or Malīnalxōch, (from Nahuatl malinalli "grass" and xochitl "flower") was a sorceress and goddess of snakes, scorpions, and insects of the desert. She claimed the title Cihuacoatl, meaning "Woman Serpent" or "Snake Woman". Her brother was Huītzilōpōchtli. During the migration, she was abandoned during her sleep by the Mexicas as directed by her brother. Afterward she had a son named Copil with Chimalcuauhtli, king of Malinalco.

See also
List of Aztec deities

References

Bibliography

Animal goddesses
Aztec goddesses
Magic goddesses
Snake goddesses